The Watani Party ("National Party", al-Ḥizb al-Waṭanī) was a nationalist political party in Egypt.

Founded as political movement in 1895, the Watani was led by Mustafa Kamil Pasha, a Francophile journalist from Alexandria. The Watany platform was composed mainly by the city bourgeoisie, monarchy's sympathizers and also by the Khedive Abbas II, a noted anglophobe.
The party also published a newspaper from 1900, Al Liwa (Arabic: The Flag), with clear anti-British views. In the same year, Abdul Hamid II nominated Mustafa Kamil as pasha for his support to the Ottoman Empire. Its anti-British positions increased after the Denshawai Incident in 1906.

The Watani became officially a party on 22 October 1907, after the first Congress of Watani. During the Congress, Mustafa Kamil supported the constitutional monarchy.  However, Kamil died only two months after the Congress, and the Watani was inherited by Mohammad Farid. Under Farid's leadership, the party supported the monarchy, law and order policies and statism, especially after the Prime Minister Boutros Ghali's assassination in 1910. Ironically, Boutros Ghali's assassin was a Watani sympathizer.

When the World War I ended and Farid died in 1919, the party began its decline. Mohammad Hafiz Ramadan Bey led the Watani and started a pro-Wafd policy, that became the first political party in Egypt.  The Watani didn't win many seats in the elections, and after the coup d'état of 1952, the party was banned.

Electoral history

House of Representatives elections

References

Banned political parties in Egypt
Defunct political parties in Egypt
Egyptian nationalist parties
1895 establishments in Egypt
Political parties established in 1895
Political parties disestablished in 1952
1952 disestablishments in Egypt
Anti-British sentiment